The Lache (sometimes simply Lache) is a housing estate in the city of Chester, in Cheshire, United Kingdom, with a population of around 10,000. The main streets are Cliveden Road, which runs through the centre of the estate, and Sycamore Drive. The area runs almost continuously into Westminster Park and Saltney.

Etymology
The etymology of the word Lache likely derives from the Old English word 'loecc, from an earlier word 'lacu' and meaning water. It therefore suggests The Lache was originally situated nearby to a body of water. There is another place in Cheshire called Shocklach which has a similar etymology.

Facilities
The Lache has two churches: St Mark's (Church of England) on St. Marks Road, and St. Clare's (Roman Catholic) on Downsfield Road. There are a number of shops including a butcher, an off-licence, a hairdresser, a bakery, a takeaway, a grocer and a newsagent. There are two schools: Lache Primary School and St Clare's Catholic Primary, with a sports facility in between the two schools. There are also several playgroups, a local branch library, a large community centre and hall, and a youth club. 

A new railway station has been proposed for The Lache.

Politics

Local government
Lache forms part of the Cheshire West and Chester council area.

British Parliament
Lache is in the City of Chester parliamentary constituency and is represented by Samantha Dixon, who has held the seat since December 2022.

Notes

External links
 Socio-economic profile of the Lache area

Areas of Chester